Raisin Wheats (formerly Raisin Splitz, Raisin Wheatleys) is a Kellogg's breakfast cereal available in the United Kingdom, made from shredded wholegrain wheat and filled with raisin. The cereal is made in bite-sized pieces measuring 3/4in x 1in and is packaged in boxes weighing 0.5 kg.

Its ingredients, as published on the Kellogg's web site 24 May 2006, are:
Shredded Wholewheat, Raisins (23%), Glycerine, Niacin, Iron, Vitamin B6, Riboflavin (B2), Thiamin (B1), Folic Acid, Vitamin B12.

The cereal has been subsequently manufactured by numerous other suppliers under a generic brand, often in supermarkets' "own brand" range.  In the United Kingdom, Tesco, Sainsbury's and Waitrose have all produced their own versions of the cereal.

External links 
 

Kellogg's cereals